Shinkailepas is a genus of sea snails or false limpets, marine gastropod mollusks in the family Phenacolepadidae.

Species
Species within the genus Shinkailepas include:

 Shinkailepas briandi Warén & Bouchet, 2001
 Shinkailepas kaikatensis Okutani, Saito & Hashimoto, 1989
 Shinkailepas mojinensis Sasaki, Okutani & Fujikura, 2003
 Shinkailepas myojinensis Sasaki, Okutani & Fujikura, 2003
 Shinkailepas tufari L. Beck, 1992

References

Phenacolepadidae